Joseph Paul Pierre Morissette (born November 22, 1944) is the Roman Catholic bishop of the Roman Catholic Diocese of Saint-Jérôme, Quebec, Canada. He was formerly bishop of the Roman Catholic Diocese of Baie-Comeau.

He was ordained to the priesthood on June 8, 1968. On February 27, 1987, he was appointed auxiliary bishop in the Roman Catholic Archdiocese of Quebec and titular bishop of Mesarfelta. On March 17, 1990, he was appointed bishop of Baie-Comeau, and on July 3, 2008 he was appointed bishop of Saint-Jérôme.

References

1944 births
Living people
20th-century Roman Catholic bishops in Canada
21st-century Roman Catholic bishops in Canada
Roman Catholic bishops of Baie-Comeau
Roman Catholic titular bishops
Roman Catholic bishops of Saint-Jérôme